Tiferet Yisrael Synagogue (Ashkenazi Hebrew: Tiferes Yisroel), most often spelled Tiferet Israel, also known as the Nisan Bak Shul, after its co-founder, Nisan Bak was a prominent synagogue between 1872 and 1948 in the Jewish Quarter of the Old City of Jerusalem.

The synagogue was inaugurated in 1872 by the Ruzhin Hasidim among the members of the Old Yishuv and was destroyed by the Jordanian Arab Legion on 21 May 1948 during the Battle for Jerusalem of the 1948 Arab–Israeli War.

The synagogue was left as ruins after the recapture of the Old City in the Six-Day War. In November 2012 the Jerusalem municipality announced its approval for plans to rebuild the synagogue. The cornerstone was laid on May 27, 2014.

Origins and name

The synagogue was built in the 1860s by the followers of Rabbi Yisrael Friedman of Ruzhin and his son Rabbi Avrohom Yaakov of Sadigura, and was named "Tiferet Yisrael" after Reb Yisrael—tiferet means "glory" or "splendour" in Hebrew, and Rabbi Yisrael was famous for conducting his court with a regal display of gold and wealth. Nevertheless, the strong involvement of Nissan Bak, led to the widespread use of the name "Nissan Bak synagogue".

Another tradition, published by a relative of the Bak family, holds that it was named after Yisrael Bak (Nissan Bak's father), who had a decisive role in the construction of the synagogue.

Although Hasidim had arrived in Jerusalem by 1747, it was only in 1839 that Nissan Bak began plans for a Hasidic synagogue. Until then they had prayed in small, private locations like Yisrael Bak's house.

In 1843 Nissan Bak traveled from Jerusalem to visit the Ruzhiner Rebbe in Sadigura. He informed him that Czar Nikolai I intended to buy a plot of land near the Western Wall with the intention of building a church and monastery there. The Ruzhiner Rebbe, who was very involved in assisting the yishuv, gave Bak the task to thwart the Czar's attempt. Bak managed to buy the land from its Arab owners for an exorbitant sum mere days before the Czar ordered the Russian counsul in Jerusalem to make the purchase for him. The Czar was forced to buy a different plot of land for a church, which is known today as the Russian Compound. When Rabbi Friedman died in 1851, his son, Rabbi Avrohom Yaakov Friedman, the first Rebbe of Sadigura, continued the task of raising the necessary funds for the project.

Construction

According to Rabbi Menachem Brayer, Nissan Beck (better known as Nisan Bak) was the architect and contractor of the project. Bak consulted architect , the very man who was designing the Russian Compound, which had to be built outside the Old City against the initial intentions of the Czar due to the efforts of rabbis Bak and Friedman. A study by architect Faina Milstein concludes that it is likely that Eppinger either fully designed, or at least advised Nisan Bak on the construction of the synagogue.

Initially the Ottoman authorities refused to grant permission to dig the foundations, and when permission was eventually granted, the crew discovered a Muslim sheik's grave on the site. Eventually the Muslim religious judge agreed for the tomb to be moved outside the city walls. After the foundations had been dug, another setback cropped up. It became apparent that it was necessary to obtain a building permit from the officials in Turkey who were not keen to grant the request. Bak, an Austrian national, convinced Franz Joseph I of Austria to intercede, and in 1858 a firman was granted. Over ten years were spent raising funds as the building slowly took shape.

There is a legend, proven by researcher Tamar Hayardeni to be non-factual and to have emerged a good 30 years after the end of the synagogue's construction, that in November 1869 Franz Joseph, en route to the inauguration of the Suez Canal, made a visit to Jerusalem. Included in his itinerary was a tour of the Jewish institutions of the city. When he toured the Old City with Bak  and others, he asked why the synagogue was standing without a roof. Bak quipped, "Why, the synagogue took off its hat in honour of Your Majesty!" The Kaiser smiled and replied, "I hope the roof will be built soon", and left the Austrian counsel with 1,000 French francs for the dome's construction. From then on, the dome was referred to by locals as "Franz Joseph's cap".

The three-story synagogue was inaugurated on 19 August 1872, 29 years after the land had been purchased. For the next 75 years, it served as the centre for the Hasidic community in the city. It was considered one of the most beautiful synagogues of Jerusalem, with a commanding view of the Temple Mount, ornate decorations, and beautiful silver objects donated by Hasidim.

Destruction

During the 1948 Arab-Israeli War, the Tiferet Yisrael Synagogue was used as a post by the Haganah in the defense of the Old City. During the Jordanian Legion's campaign to capture the Old City, it blew up the synagogue an hour after midnight on the night of May 20–21, 1948.

Modern-day ruin and reconstruction plans
Following the Six-Day War, the decision was made to leave the ruins of the synagogue as they were. Only its western wall remains. In 2010, at the dedication of the reconstructed Hurva Synagogue, also destroyed in 1948, plans were announced by the same donors who sponsored the Hurva rebuilding, to rebuild the Tiferet Yisrael Synagogue as well.

In November 2012, the Jerusalem municipality approved a plan to rebuild the synagogue. Funding would come from an anonymous donor. As of 2023 it has not finished being rebuilt.

Tiferes Yisroel yeshiva and synagogue

In 1953 Rabbi Mordechai Shlomo Friedman, the Boyaner Rebbe of New York, laid foundations for a new Ruzhiner Torah centre in the New City of Jerusalem to replace the destroyed Ruzhiner synagogue. In 1957 the Ruzhiner yeshiva, called Mesivta Tiferes Yisroel, was inaugurated with the support of all of the Rebbes of the Ruzhiner dynasty. A large synagogue was built adjacent to it, also bearing the name Tiferes Yisroel; the current Boyaner Rebbe, Rabbi Nachum Dov Brayer, leads his Hasidut from here. The design of the synagogue, located on the western end of Malkhei Yisrael Street close to the Central Bus Station, includes a large white dome, reminiscent of the domed Tiferet Yisrael Synagogue that was destroyed in the Old City.

See also
 Ruzhin (Hasidic dynasty)

References

External links
 Early Architectural Drawing of the Tiferet Yisrael Synagogue – Jerusalem, 1855, an architectural plan with a section and elevation of the proposed building, drawn and signed in Jerusalem in 1855. At 2016 auction page, accessed November 2020.

Ashkenazi Jewish culture in Jerusalem
Ashkenazi synagogues
Hasidic Judaism in Israel
Synagogues in Jerusalem
Late modern history of Jerusalem
Former synagogues in Israel
Destroyed synagogues
Jewish Quarter (Jerusalem)
Ruzhin (Hasidic dynasty)
1870s establishments in Ottoman Syria
1948 disestablishments in Mandatory Palestine
Synagogue buildings with domes
Buildings and structures demolished in 1948
Yiddish culture in Mandatory Palestine